Matabei (written: 又兵衛) is a masculine Japanese given name. Notable people with the name include:

 (1565–1615), Japanese samurai
 (1578–1650), Japanese artist
 (1817–1864), Japanese samurai
 (1590–1671), Japanese swordsman

See also
Matabei (crater), impact crater on Mercury

Japanese masculine given names